Because of Winn-Dixie is a 2005 family film based on Kate DiCamillo's 2000 novel of the same name, with the screenplay written by Joan Singleton, produced by Trevor Albert and directed by Wayne Wang. It was produced by Walden Media and released by 20th Century Fox. It stars AnnaSophia Robb (in her debut film role), Jeff Daniels, Cicely Tyson, Luke Benward, Dave Matthews, Eva Marie Saint, Courtney Jines, B.J. Hopper, Nick Price, Elle Fanning, Harland Williams, and John McConnell. It premiered at the USA Film Festival on January 26, 2005 and was theatrically released on February 18, 2005. It received mixed reviews from critics and earned $33.5 million against a production budget of $14 million. It was released on DVD and VHS on August 9, 2005, by 20th Century Fox Home Entertainment.

Plot
Ten-year-old India Opal Buloni has just moved to the fictional small town of Naomi, Florida with her father who is a preacher.

While at Winn-Dixie, Opal encounters a scruffy Berger Picard that is wreaking havoc. She (not wanting the manager to send him to the pound) claims that he is her dog and names him "Winn-Dixie". He becomes friends with everyone he encounters, and so Opal makes some new friends in the process. She also rekindles her relationship with her father and learns ten things about her mother, Benjean-Megan, who abandoned them when she was three. She describes the preacher as a turtle, always sticking his head into his shell, and never wanting to come out into the real world. This is most likely because of how sad he is about her mother, whom he is still in love with.

One of the people Opal meets is Miss Franny Block, a kind and somewhat eccentric elder librarian, who tells her many great stories, including one involving a bear who invaded the library. She also meets Gloria Dump, a blind African-American recovering alcoholic with a "mistake tree" with beer bottles hanging from it in her backyard. She tells Opal that the bottles, including alcohol bottles, represent the ghosts of all the things she has done wrong.

One day, fed up with Winn-Dixie, the landlord of the Bulonis' trailer park, Mr. Alfred, demands they get rid of him. The preacher calls the pound, but Opal begs to keep him. Unable to see her upset, he asks the pound to return Winn-Dixie, claiming he is not the same dog he called about. The preacher is able to convince Mr. Alfred to allow them three months' time to find Winn-Dixie a new home. However, it is later revealed that, like a lot of the characters, Mr. Alfred is dealing with difficult feelings which impact how he interacts with the Bulonis and Winn-Dixie.

Opal gets a job at Gertrude's Pets and befriends the manager Otis, a shy ex-convict with a passion for music. She also meets a young girl named Sweetie Pie Thomas, who is eager to get a dog like Winn-Dixie. With enough new friends, Opal and Gloria decide to host a party. Opal also takes a risk by inviting Mr. Alfred to the party as well, which he, after hesitating, begrudgingly accepts. Opal also becomes a friend to her former enemies, the brothers Stevie and Dunlap Dewberry, and to her sour-faced neighbor, Amanda Wilkinson, who lost her younger brother Carson when he drowned in the town lake the previous summer, which inspires Opal's compassion.

During the party, a severe thunderstorm strikes, and Winn-Dixie, being pathologically afraid of them, runs away. While Opal looks for him, her father wants to give up and she blames him for the loss of her mother and Winn-Dixie running away. He explains that he tried very hard to look for her mother. He then admits that it was his fault that she left him, and he believes that she is never coming back. However, he is grateful that she left Opal with him. Later they go back to the party and Otis starts to play a song on his guitar. Winn-Dixie is heard outside howling along to it. Everyone, while singing, lets him in and welcomes him back.

Cast
 AnnaSophia Robb as India Opal Buloni
 Jeff Daniels as Mr. Buloni "The Preacher"
 Cicely Tyson as Gloria Dump
 Luke Benward as Steven "Stevie" Dewberry
 Dave Matthews as Otis
 Eva Marie Saint as Ms. Franny Block
 Courtney Jines as Amanda Wilkinson
 B.J. Hopper as Mr. Alfred
 Nick Price as Dunlap Dewberry
 Elle Fanning as Sweetie Pie Thomas
 Harland Williams as Policeman

Animals
 Becca Lish as Gertrude (voice)
 Lyco and Scott as Winn-Dixie

Production

The film was directed by Wayne Wang; produced by Trevor Albert, Walden Media, and Joan Singleton; distributed by 20th Century Fox; with music composed by Rachel Portman. It was shot on location in Napoleonville, Louisiana, with some shooting in Gibson, Louisiana. To make sure both dogs got on well with AnnaSophia Robb, who played Opal, she was brought in early to get acquainted with them and give them treats. By the time shooting started, they considered her a "safe" area.  Winn-Dixie was played by multiple Picardy Shepherds, a rare breed from France. The DVD extra "Diamond in the Ruff" shows the two principal dogs named Scott and Lyco, but producer Trevor Albert mentions in the DVD feature commentary that, in all, four dogs were used. In the featurette "Meet Winn-Dixie" AnnaSophia Robb mentions that the stunt dog named Tasha jumped over the flour. The film's mouse was played by a rat. The choice was made carefully because while mice would have been preferable, rats are much easier to train.

Director Wayne Wang wanted to use Picardy Shepherds because he thought they looked similar to the depiction of Winn-Dixie on the book cover and would appear familiar to its readers. Dogs were brought from France when none were available in the U.S. The film, like the book, is set in Naomi, Florida, even though it was filmed in Louisiana. Consequently, the police car and uniform emblems depict Florida rather than Louisiana. The bunny that Otis hands Opal (at around 56 mins) is a Netherland Dwarf. They only get to be between 6 and 8 inches long.

Soundtrack
 "Opal's Blues" – The Be Good Tanyas
 "Won't Give In" – The Finn Brothers
 "Splish Splash" – Adam Schlesinger and James Iha
 "Sunflower" – Alice Peacock
 "The Clapping Song" – Shirley Ellis
 String Quartet #17 ("Hunt")
 "Butterfly" – Dave Matthews
 "Sunrise" – Norah Jones
 "Cabaret" – Emmylou Harris
 "I've Gotta See You Smile" - Leigh Nash
 "Glory Glory" – AnnaSophia Robb, Jeff Daniels, Cicely Tyson, Dave Matthews, Eva Marie Saint, Courtney Jines, Nick Price, Luke Benward, Elle Fanning, and B.J. Hopper
 "Glory Glory" – Patrinell Wright and Gloria Smith
 "Someday Somehow (Have It All)" – The Beu Sisters
 "Fly" – Shawn Colvin
 "Amazing Grace" – Rachel Portman

Release
The film was released in cinemas in the USA on February 5, 2005, and was released on DVD and VHS on August 9, 2005, by 20th Century Fox Home Entertainment making this the last film from the studio to be released on VHS.

Reception
The film received mixed reviews from critics. Rotten Tomatoes gives it a score of 55% based on 121 reviews, with an average rating of 5.8/10. The site's consensus was: "An old-fashioned, if bland, adaptation of Kate DiCamillo's novel." At Metacritic, it has a score of 54% based on 27 reviews, indicating "mixed or average reviews".

Awards
AnnaSophia Robb was nominated in several categories, Best Performance in a Feature Film (Comedy or Drama) – Leading Young Actress – Best Family Feature Film – Comedy or Musical, at the Young Artist Awards 2006 Best book awards.

References

External links
 
 

2005 films
20th Century Fox films
American comedy-drama films
American children's drama films
Walden Media films
Films shot in Louisiana
Films based on American novels
Films based on children's books
Films directed by Wayne Wang
Films about pets
Films scored by Rachel Portman
Films set in Florida
Films about dogs
2005 comedy-drama films
Films about father–daughter relationships
2000s English-language films
2000s American films